William Chipman may refer to:
 William Allen Chipman (1757–1845), Nova Scotian lawyer, judge and politician
 William Everett Chipman (1822–1893), American politician
 William Henry Chipman (1807–1870), Canadian politician